ARCO Arena (known as Power Balance Pavilion from 2011 to 2012 and Sleep Train Arena from 2012 until 2022), was an indoor arena located in Sacramento, California, United States. Opened in 1988, it was the home of the Sacramento Kings of the National Basketball Association (NBA) from 1988 to 2016. It hosted nearly 200 spectator events each year. The arena was named for ARCO, at the time in 1988, a Los Angeles-based independent oil and gas company that today is now a brand owned by Findlay, Ohio-based Marathon Petroleum. It was later named for Sleep Train, a chain of mattress and bed retailers based in Rocklin, California, that at the time of the agreement was a subsidiary of Mattress Firm, a Houston-based retailer that has since re-branded all Sleep Train stores as Mattress Firm. Several major entertainers have performed at the venue before its closure including Bruno Mars and Linkin Park.

History

The original ARCO Arena, where the Kings played their home games for three seasons (1985–1988) after moving from Kansas City, had a capacity of 10,333 seats.

This arena was also the home for the Sacramento Attack of the Arena Football League in 1992, their only season, the WNBA's Sacramento Monarchs until they folded in 2009 and the Sacramento River Rats of Roller Hockey International.

ARCO Arena was located in a once isolated area on the expanding northern outskirts of the city. It was constructed at a cost of just $40 million, the lowest of any venue in the NBA. It is the smallest arena in the NBA with a seating capacity of 17,317, and has 30 luxury suites and 412 club seats. It can host such varied events as concerts, ice shows, rodeos and monster truck rallies. At one time nearly two million spectators from throughout Northern California visited ARCO Arena in a year. The configuration for ice shows and ice hockey actually runs perpendicular to the basketball court with the normal sideline seating being retractable to allow for an international standard ice rink.

In 2006, there was a campaign to build a new $600 million facility in downtown Sacramento, which was to be funded by a quarter cent sales tax increase over 15 years; voters overwhelmingly rejected ballot measures Q and R, leading to the NBA publicly calling for a new arena to be built at another well-known Sacramento facility, Cal Expo, the site of California's state fair.

The original namesake sponsor of the arena was ARCO. On March 19, 2007, the Maloof brothers announced a multi-year agreement extending the naming rights of ARCO Arena. ARCO's sponsorship agreement ran out in February 2011. The arena was renamed Power Balance Pavilion on March 1, 2011 for its new sponsor, Power Balance, a manufacturer of sports wristbands. On October 15, 2012, the arena assumed its final name when The Sleep Train purchased the naming rights.

The arena's center-hung scoreboard was designed as a joint venture between Panasonic and White Way Sign.  Originally it contained four LCD video screens (one on each side) plus enough room for two players' stats on each team; as pro basketball grew in popularity, the scoreboard was upgraded in 1991 so that stats for five players on each team could be shown; the original video screens were replaced a decade later with Panasonic Astrovision LED video screens.

The last Kings home game at Sleep Train Arena was on April 9, 2016, a 114–112 win against the Oklahoma City Thunder. The last points scored in the arena were two free throws by the Kings' Rudy Gay with one second left to clinch the game for the Kings.

The last ticketed event at Sleep Train Arena was the Ringling Bros. and Barnum & Bailey Circus on September 19, 2016. The circus also opened the arena back in 1988. The last planned non-ticketed event was Sacramento State's winter commencement ceremonies on December 17, 2016.

Though the arena is technically closed and seats in the upper bowl removed, it still hosts occasional events such as conferences and swap meets. Jehovah's Witnesses have used the arena for an extended stay in 2019.

In April 2020, state health officials announced that the Sleep Train Arena would be converted into a temporary hospital in response to the COVID-19 pandemic in California. The field hospital will treat coronavirus patients with mild to moderate symptoms while area hospitals would continue to treat acute care patients.

In June 2021, the Sacramento Kings and the City of Sacramento announced that the site had been donated to California Northstate University, and that a medical school and hospital will be built there. On March 19, 2022, the Sacramento Kings hosted the final ever event at the arena, reverting to the original ARCO Arena name for a free farewell event attended by thousands of fans and Kings personnel/alumni. Fans were allowed to enter the arena, reminisce about their past memories there, and say their goodbyes before the arena's impending demolition. Demolition plans were formally submitted to the City of Sacramento, and after an environmental hold on the demolition plans went through. The demolition process began on August 9, 2022 and was completed in October 2022.

Events

High school basketball
ARCO Arena has hosted several state high school basketball championship games (1992, 1996, 1998–2009, 2011–2014, 2016).

College sports
The arena has also hosted NCAA men's basketball tournaments multiple times and was the host site for the 2007 NCAA Volleyball Championships.

WWE
ARCO Arena has hosted several WWE events including the 1993 Royal Rumble, Judgment Day 2001, and The Bash in 2009.

MMA
ARCO Arena has played host to four Ultimate Fighting Championship events: UFC 65, UFC 73, UFC on Fox: Johnson vs. Benavidez 2 and UFC 177. The arena hosted World Extreme Cagefighting's first ever pay-per-view event, WEC 48, on April 24, 2010. It also hosted the WEC's two biggest events ever, WEC 34, Faber vs. Pulver 1, and WEC 41, Brown vs. Faber 2, with an average of 1,300,500 viewers on Versus each. It also hosted WEC.

Other events
Other notable events include the five-day 1995 Billy Graham Greater Sacramento Crusade, which 177,000 people attended. A crowd of 47,500 people reportedly showed up on one night of the event, when Michael W. Smith was the musical guest; only 18,000 people were permitted inside and many watched on outside television screens.

ARCO Arena hosted many graduation celebrations for local high schools.

The arena hosted a PBR Built Ford Tough Series bull riding event every year from 2005 to 2016.

ARCO Park
ARCO Park is an unfinished multi-purpose stadium directly north of the arena. The original plan was to have a AAA minor-league baseball stadium adjacent to the basketball stadium. The stadium would have been capable of expansion to accommodate both a Major League Baseball team (possibly the Oakland A's) and a National Football League team (possibly the-then Los Angeles Raiders). However, the facility was never finished because the Sacramento Sports Association ran out of money during construction in 1989 and a team was never secured. The remnants of this incomplete stadium include foundations and a tunnel leading to the basketball arena. With the subsequent redevelopment of the ARCO Arena site into California Northstate University's Medical Center Campus, the remnants of the incomplete stadium are likely to be demolished.

Popular culture

There is an instrumental song called "Arco Arena" on the album Comfort Eagle by Sacramento band Cake. The band also released a version of the song with lyrics as a B-Side. The music video for Bell Biv DeVoe's "She's Dope" was filmed at the arena.

The arena set a Guinness World Record for loudest sports roar by reaching 126 decibels on November 15, 2013.

References

Basketball venues in California
Sports venues in Sacramento, California
Indoor arenas in California
Mixed martial arts venues in California
Demolished music venues in the United States
Indoor ice hockey venues in California
Indoor soccer venues in California
Defunct basketball venues in the United States
Defunct indoor arenas in California
Former National Basketball Association venues
Sacramento Kings venues
Sacramento Monarchs venues
ARCO
Demolished sports venues in California
Event venues established in 1988
1988 establishments in California
2022 disestablishments in California
Sports venues completed in 1988
Sports venues demolished in 2022